Paino may refer to:

 Paino Hehea (born 1979), rugby player
 Troy Paino, academic, president of University of Mary Washington, Fredericksburg, VA